Liliana Mabel Bocchi (born 26 May 1953) is a former Italian basketball player.

Career
Bocchi is one of the most famous Italian basketball players ever, winner of the bronze medal at the EuroBasket Women 1974.

See also
 List of members of the FIBA Hall of Fame
 Italian Basketball Hall of Fame
 List of EuroLeague Women winning players

References

External links
  

1953 births
Living people
Italian women's basketball players
Centers (basketball)
Sportspeople from Parma
20th-century Italian women